Robert Stephenson (born 10 November 1875) was an English footballer. His regular position was as a forward.

He played for Talbot and Newton Heath. He scored on his debut in the Heathens' 3–0 victory against Rotherham Town on 11 January 1896. An amateur inside forward, while still a student, he returned to amateur football after a most promising League debut.

References

External links
MUFCInfo.com profile

1875 births
Year of death missing
English footballers
Manchester United F.C. players
Association football forwards